Steven Smith Jr.,  (born December 24, 1945) is a Canadian actor, writer and comedian. He is best known as the co-creator and star of the sketch comedy show The Red Green Show (1991–2006), for which he portrayed the title character.

Early life
Smith was born in Toronto on Christmas Eve 1945. Before turning to comedy, he studied engineering at the University of Waterloo and then worked a variety of jobs. In 1979, he began to produce, write, and star in Smith & Smith, a sketch comedy series with a cast consisting of Smith and his wife, Morag Smith. The show was produced for Hamilton, Ontario's CHCH-TV and syndicated to other television stations in Canada.

Career

In 1985, Smith created the family sitcom Me & Max. After the first season the Smiths went back to sketch comedy, creating the series The Comedy Mill, which ran for four years. Smith was a writer on Offside, a sports comedy series for CTV, head writer for Global's Laughing Matters, and the TV pilot of Out of Our Minds with David Steinberg. He wrote three episodes of CBS' Top Cops series.

In 1991 Smith starred in The Red Green Show. In all, 300 episodes of the series were produced. In 1997, Smith was credited as his alter-ego, Red Green, in "Pavement", an episode of the Cartoon Network/Adult Swim show Space Ghost Coast to Coast. In 2002 the full-length movie Duct Tape Forever was produced. Smith writes a syndicated newspaper column as Red Green, distributed by Newspaper Enterprise Association. In 2009, as a public service announcement by the Ontario Provincial Police and the Ontario Power Generation, Smith supplied his voice to a talking fish, warning of the dangers of illegal fishing near government hydro dams. In 2004, Smith hosted a show on Space called Steve Smith Playhouse.

Steve Smith has performed as Red Green on several tours, including the "Wit & Wisdom" Tour (2013), "How to Do Everything" Tour (2014), and the "I'm Not Old, I'm Ripe" North American Tour (2016). The 2019 North American tour, "This Could Be It", began in March 2019 and ran until the end of October, with shows in 34 U.S. cities and 29 Canadian cities.

Personal life
Smith and his wife Morag have been married since 1966 and have two sons, Dave and Max. They also have three grandchildren.

On February 17, 2006, Smith was made a Member of the Order of Canada, and on June 13, 2011, Smith received an honorary Doctor of Letters from McMaster University.

See also
 List of University of Waterloo people

References

External links

 
 
 
 Steve Smith on YouTube
 Steve Smith on George Stroumboulopoulos Tonight

1945 births
Canadian male film actors
Canadian male television actors
Canadian male voice actors
Canadian television personalities
Canadian satirists
Comedians from Toronto
Living people
Canadian stand-up comedians
Male actors from Hamilton, Ontario
Male actors from Toronto
Members of the Order of Canada
University of Waterloo alumni
Writers from Toronto
Canadian sketch comedians
20th-century Canadian male actors
20th-century Canadian comedians
21st-century Canadian male actors
21st-century Canadian comedians
Canadian male comedians